{{DISPLAYTITLE:C17H25NO2}}
The molecular formula C17H25NO2 (molar mass : 275.39 g/mol) may refer to:

 Magellanine
 Menthyl anthranilate
 5-MeO-DiBF
 3-MeO-PCMo
 Meprodine, Alpha-meprodine, Beta-meprodine
 Metethoheptazine
 N-Octyl bicycloheptene dicarboximide
 PCAA
 Proheptazine
 Trimeperidine